Nuria Ayala (born 28 March 1970) is a former synchronized swimmer from Spain. She competed in both the 1988 and 1992 Summer Olympics.

References 

1970 births
Living people
Spanish synchronized swimmers
Olympic synchronized swimmers of Spain
Synchronized swimmers at the 1988 Summer Olympics
Synchronized swimmers at the 1992 Summer Olympics